State Service on Property Issues is state service under the Ministry of Economy of the Republic of Azerbaijan conducting state policy and regulation on management of state property, its privatization, investment in this property, maintaining the state register of real estate, maintaining a unified state cadastre of real property, maintaining of an address register, maintaining the state land cadastre, land management, organization of state land management, overseeing land use and land protection, arranging land market.

History
By the Decree of the President of the Republic of Azerbaijan on expanding the functions and structure of the Ministry of Economy of the Republic of Azerbaijan on October 23, 2019, the State Committee for Property Issues was included in the structure of the Ministry of Economy of the Republic of Azerbaijan.

Regulations of the State Service for Property Issues under the Ministry of Economy of the Republic of Azerbaijan were approved by the Decree of the President of the Republic of Azerbaijan dated May 12, 2020

Administration 
Chief of the State Service on Property Issues under the Ministry of Economy: 

Matin Eynullayev Balasan oglu 

Deputy Chiefs of the State Service on Property Issues under the Ministry of Economy:

Yusubov Elchin Mustafa oglu

Shahbazov Rustam Adigozal oglu

Duties 

 Implements several tasks defined by the Regulations on the State Service for Property Affairs under the Ministry of Economy of the Republic of Azerbaijan:
 to participate in the preparation of normative legal acts regulating the relevant field, to give opinions and proposals on them;
 to participate in the preparation of draft state programs and development concepts in the relevant field and to ensure its implementation;
 to participate in the analysis, forecasting, and identification of perspective development directions of the development of various sectors of the economy in connection with the management and privatization of state property;
 to ensure the management and privatization of state property, its disposal, registration, and attraction of investments in privatized state enterprises;
 to exercise control over the protection and preservation of state property, to organize the compilation of inventory lists of state property by state-owned legal entities, to analyze the situation of efficient use of state property based on reports on the use of property, to give consent to change the purpose of state real estate;
 To organize the maintenance of the State Property Register, to obtain the necessary information from state bodies (institutions) for this purpose, etc.

Activities of the Service 
Directions of the activities of the Service defined by its Statute are:

 participating in the formulation of public policy in the relevant field and ensuring the implementation of this policy;
 providing development of the relevant sector;
 carrying out normative activity in the relevant field;
 managing of state property located in the territory of the Republic of Azerbaijan and abroad, making arrangements about them, taking measures to increase the efficiency of management of state property;
 carrying out privatization of state property, including state housing fund and lands;
 keeping records of state property and dealing, organizing inventory of state property;
 compiling and maintaining the state register of real estate, carrying out state registration of property and other property rights;
 developing and maintaining the Uniform State Cadastre of Real Property, the State Land Cadastre and the land registry which is a part thereof;
 maintaining address register, providing addressing to real estate objects;
 taking measures to organize the land market;
 organizing and implementing land management activities to regulate land relations and addressing effective land use;
 organizing and performing special (field) geodetic works in order to conduct state registration of real property rights and state registration of real estate, single state cadastre of real estate and land cadastre, land management activities, as well as overseeing state surveillance in this area;
 submitting the maps of municipalities prepared on electronic carriers and paper, as well as the report in regard with quarterly changes in state, municipal and privately owned lands within the territories of municipalities to the Administration of the President of Azerbaijan.

State programs on privatization of state property 
State Program on Improvement of State Property Management of the Republic of Azerbaijan 

2nd State Program of Privatization of State Property in the Republic of Azerbaijan 

State program on development of cadastre system of real estate, increase efficiency of land use and protection in the Republic of Azerbaijan for 2016-2020

See also
Cabinet of Azerbaijan
Housing in Azerbaijan
Ministry of Economy

References

Government agencies of Azerbaijan
Government agencies established in 2009
2009 establishments in Azerbaijan